The Bible of Kralice, also called the Kralice Bible, was the first complete translation of the Bible from the original languages into Czech. Translated by the Unity of the Brethren and printed in Kralice nad Oslavou, the first edition had six volumes and was published between 1579 and 1593. The third edition, from 1613, is classic and till this day widely known and used Czech translation. The New Testament had been translated from the Greek by Jan Blahoslav and published in 1564.

See also

 Bible translations into Czech
 Slavic translations of the Bible

External links 
 Bible of Kralice – electronic version of the first edition (in Czech)
 Bible of Kralice – electronic version of the latest edition (in Czech)
 Travelling exhibition shows history of Bible in Czech lands – This exhibition includes the Bible of Kralice and a photo shows the Bible.
 The Kralice Bible – short history of the edition and the details of its printing, with special attention given to a full 6-volume set preserved at the Moravian Archives, Bethlehem.

1579 books
1593 books
1613 books
Kralice
Czech literature
History of the Moravian Church
16th-century Christian texts
History of Moravia
History of Christianity in the Czech Republic
Czech lands under Habsburg rule
Protestantism in the Czech Republic